Goldthorpe is a surname. Notable people with the surname include:
Albert Goldthorpe, English rugby footballer
Bill "Goldie" Goldthorpe, Canadian ice hockey player
John Goldthorpe, British sociologist
John Goldthorpe (rugby league), rugby league footballer who played in the 1890s
Noel Goldthorpe, Australian rugby league footballer